Krzysztof Wilmanski (March 1, 1940 – August 26, 2012) was a Polish-German scientist working in the fields of continuum mechanics and thermodynamics.

Main research fields 
 axiomatic and kinetic foundations of continuum thermodynamics,
 mixture theory,
 phase transformations in solids,
 non-newtonian fluids,
 acoustic waves in continua,
 crystal plasticity and the evolution of textures,
 thermodynamics of porous materials.

Visiting posts 
 postgraduate at the Johns Hopkins University in Baltimore (USA, 1969–70)
 visiting professor at the University of Baghdad (Iraq, 1972–74)
 von Humboldt stipend (Germany, 1979)
 fellow at Wissenschaftskolleg zu Berlin (Germany, 1984-1985)
 visiting professor at the University of Paderborn (Germany, 1986–87)
 research fellow at the Technical University of Hamburg-Harburg (Germany, 1987–90)
 the Technical University of Berlin (Germany, 1991–92)
 the University of Essen (Germany, 1992-1996)
 head of the Research Group Continuum Mechanics in the Weierstrass Institute for Applied Analysis and Stochastics in Berlin (Germany, 1996-2005)
 professor of Mechanics at the University of Zielona Góra (Poland, 2005-2010)
 member of the faculty of the ROSE School, Centre for Post-Graduate Training and Research in Pavia, Italy

Main original contributions to research 
 axiomatic foundations of continuum thermodynamics
 thermodynamics of Maxwellian heat conducting fluids
 thermodynamics of poroelastic materials under large deformations
 modelling of porous materials with the balance equation of porosity
(publication list)

Selected books 
 Wilmanski, K.: Thermomechanics of Continua, Springer, Berlin, N.Y., 1998, .
 Wilmanski, K.: Continuum Thermodynamics, Part I: Foundations, World Scientific, Singapore, 2008, .
 Albers, B. (ed.): Continuous Media with Microstructure. Collection in Honor of Krzysztof Wilmanski, Springer, Berlin, Heidelberg, 2010, .

References 

1940 births
20th-century Polish physicists
20th-century German physicists
2012 deaths